Našice is a town in eastern Croatia, located on the northern slopes of the Krndija mountain in eastern Slavonia, 51 km southwest of regional hub Osijek. Administratively it belongs to Osijek-Baranja County.

Geography
Našice is located on the D2 state road Varaždin–Virovitica–Našice–Osijek and the Varaždin–Dalj railway.

Economy
Chief occupations are farming and angling on 11 km2 of fishing ground. Major industries include metal processing, cement, (at Našice cement), the stone excavation. Also wood processing, textiles and food.

History
The town was first mentioned in 1229 under the name of Nekche. In the 13th century, the Knights Templar came to Našice and built a church. It was conquered by Ottoman Empire in 1541 and was part of Sanjak of Pojega till Austrian conquest in 1687. In the late 19th and early 20th century, Našice was a district capital in the Virovitica County of the Kingdom of Croatia-Slavonia.

Significant part of town was a feudal property of the Pejačević family until 1945. With the arrival of communism in Eastern and Central Europe, the family was expropriated and exiled. With the return of democracy, family properties were returned partially to its members.

In September 1991 Croatian forces in Našice captured military barracks of Yugoslav People's Army.

Population

According to the census of 2011, there are 7,888 inhabitants in town, with 16,224 in the administrative area. 88% of the population are Croats.

Settlements
The municipality of Našice includes the following settlements:
 Brezik Našički, population 352
 Ceremošnjak, population 108
 Crna Klada, uninhabited
 Gradac Našički, population 153
 Granice, population 109
 Jelisavac, population 1,265
 Lađanska, population 302
 Lila, population 195
 Londžica, population 190
 Makloševac, population 130
 Markovac Našički, population 1,586
 Martin, population 1,077
 Našice, population 7,888
 Polubaše, population 17
 Ribnjak, population 51
 Rozmajerovac, population 25
 Velimirovac, population 1,129
 Vukojevci, population 914
 Zoljan, population 733

Culture
Hunting grounds can be found in the immediate surroundings, and the fishpond Našička Breznica and Lake Lapovac offer angling opportunities. Slavonian cuisine and freshwater fish are a part of the gastronomic offerings of the town and its surroundings.

As an economic and cultural centre, the area is known for its cultural and historical heritage, (the Gothic church, two manor houses, exhibitions of the art colony "Hinko Juhn"). Našice plays a role in business and excursionist tourism. The park by both of the Pejačević manors (horticultural monument). The private zoo of the Bizik family in nearby in Markovac Našički as well as the surroundings at the foot of the Krndija hill emphasize the importance of natural environment.

The town has an official memorial-area Crni Potok, dedicated to Croatian quisling soldiers and civilians killed at the site by members of the Yugoslav Partisans. The site is commemorated annually on the third Saturday in June.

Sports
Sports opportunities comprise tennis court, a football ground with accompanying facilities, and boating on the local waters. Footballers from Našice include AEK Athens defender Domagoj Vida midfielder Danijel Pranjić and Danijel Stojanović. Football club NK NAŠK plays in Croatian Third Football League. Našice is proudest of its handball team RK Nexe. Currently, RK Nexe competes in the Premijer liga and the Croatian Handball Cup as well in the SEHA League and in the EHF Cup.

References

External links

  

 
Slavonia
Osijek-Baranja County
Cities and towns in Croatia
Populated places in Osijek-Baranja County